Tabarin is a 1958 French-Italian drama film, directed by Richard Pottier.

Plot
Director of music hall Le Tabarin, Jacques Forestier has big ambitions for his establishment. He committed his former mistress, Florence, as "star" of the show, but she turns out all the maneuvers ready to become owner of Tabarin.

Cast

 Michel Piccoli as Jacques Forestier
 Sylvia Lopez as Florence Didier
 Annie Cordy as Mimi
 Sonja Ziemann as Rosine Forestier
 Henri Vilbert as Morelli
 Mischa Auer as Boris
 Jean-Pierre Kérien as Larjac
 Germaine Damar as Brigitte
 Enrico Glori as Truffaut
 Luisella Boni as Simone
 Jean Lefebvre as Julien
 Kessler Twins as The twins
 Nicole Vattier as Madame Leroux
 Angelo Dessy as Paolo

Production
The movie was released in France 21 May 1958, in Mexico, 29 January 1960 and in Denmark, 16 January 1961.

External links

1958 films
1950s French-language films
1958 comedy-drama films
French comedy-drama films
Italian comedy-drama films
1958 comedy films
1958 drama films
1950s French films
1950s Italian films